Allowitz Peak is a peak,  high, rising immediately west of Mount Troubridge in Hedgpeth Heights of the Anare Mountains, Victoria Land, Antarctica. Mapped by United States Geological Survey from surveys and U.S. Navy air photos, 1960–63. Named by Advisory Committee on Antarctic Names for Ronald D. Allowitz, United States Antarctic Research Program biologist at Hallett Station, 1962–63. The peak is situated on the Pennell Coast, a portion of Antarctica lying between Cape Williams and Cape Adare.

References
 

Mountains of Victoria Land
Pennell Coast